James Richmond (1843 – June 3, 1864) was a Union Army soldier in the American Civil War and a recipient of the U.S. military's highest decoration, the Medal of Honor, for his actions at the Battle of Gettysburg.

Born in 1843 in Maine, Richmond was living in Toledo, Ohio, when he joined the Army. He served during the war as a private in Company F of the 8th Ohio Infantry. On July 3, 1863, during the Battle of Gettysburg, he captured a Confederate battle flag.

He was wounded at the Battle of Spotsylvania Court House the next year, on May 12, 1864, and died of his injuries weeks later, on June 3. He is buried at Arlington National Cemetery.

For his actions at Gettysburg, Richmond was posthumously awarded the Medal of Honor on December 1, 1864. His official citation reads simply: "Capture of flag."

See also
List of Medal of Honor recipients for the Battle of Gettysburg
List of American Civil War Medal of Honor recipients: Q–S

References

External links 
 

1843 births
1864 deaths
People from Maine
People of Ohio in the American Civil War
Union Army soldiers
United States Army Medal of Honor recipients
Union military personnel killed in the American Civil War
American Civil War recipients of the Medal of Honor